Bad Luck is a 2015 Austrian tragic-comic film directed by Thomas Woschitz. It debuted at the 36. Filmfestival Max Ophüls Preis 2015.

Plot 
Bad Luck has three interlinked episodes: Dagmar is kicked out of her flat, Lippo is sacked by his boss and Karl is seriously in debt. Then there is Rizzo, who just doesn't fit in. Their lives cross unexpectedly at a petrol station somewhere in rural Carinthia.

Music 
The music for the film was composed by Manfred Plessl and Oliver Welter from the Austrian group Naked Lunch.

References

External links 
 Official website
 

2015 films
Austrian comedy-drama films
2010s German-language films